Archips crataegana, the brown oak tortrix, is a moth of the family Tortricidae. It is found in most of Europe east to Japan.

The wingspan is about 20 mm for males and about 25 mm for females. Adults are sexually dimorphic. The forewings have a sinuate termen There is an irregular vertical, costal fold from the base to 2/3 and light brown or ochreous-brown There is a transverse dorsal spot near the base. The central fascia has the anterior edge angulated below middle. The costal patch is extended as a streak to the  termen above the tornus. It is dark ochreous-brown. The fascia is attenuated and sometimes obsolete towards costa. The hindwings are grey, the apex in female sometimes yellowish. Julius von Kennel provides a full description.

They are on wing from June to August.

The larvae feed on various deciduous trees, including Quercus, Ulmus, Fraxinus and Salix species. They feed in a tightly-rolled leaf. The species overwinters as an egg.

Subspecies
Archips crataeganus crataeganus
Archips crataeganus endoi Yasuda, 1975 (South Korea, Japan, China: Heilongjiang, Jilin, Shaanxi, Sichuan)

References

Moths described in 1796
Archips
Moths of Asia
Tortricidae of Europe